= Recycleddisplays.com =

Recycleddisplays.com is the creation of Conn Burke, a consultant, display and mannequin supplier in the retail display business since 1971. In the midst of the retail recession of the 1980s, Burke observed that a number of the retailers closing their stores had very high quality store fixtures. He began to purchase and resell these pieces alongside new stock. After further investigation into the display practices of the larger chains, he discovered that a number of these companies were renovating their stores on a regular basis and that good quality store fixtures were ending up in landfills. Burke created recycleddisplays.com to rescue these fixtures from the landfill and make high quality and unique store fixtures available to smaller and start-up retailers.

The layout, design and fixturing of a store can play a large role in the success or failure of new retailers. The ability to access the good store displays at a fair price can be essential to an effective launch. Burke also acknowledges the need for stores to constantly be updating their look and provides fixture buy back services, as well as rentals. Additionally, the company is a favorite supplier of the local film and television industry. Many of his finds have also found new lives as furnishings for lofts and condos. The company now carries a mixture of rescued, recycled store fixtures alongside new items. They sell and ship across North America and are starting to branch out into Europe.

== Awards ==
2010 nominated for a Green Toronto Award.
